The end of train device (ETD), sometimes referred to as an EOT, flashing rear-end device (FRED) or sense and braking unit (SBU) is an electronic device mounted on the end of freight trains in lieu of a caboose. They are divided into three categories: "dumb" units, which only provide a visible indication of the rear of the train with a flashing red taillight; "average intelligence" units with a brake pipe pressure gauge; and "smart" units, which send back data to the crew in the locomotive via radio-based telemetry. They originated in North America, and are also used elsewhere in the world, where they may include complete End of Train Air System (ETAS) or Sense and Brake Unit (SBU) devices.

Tail lamps 

The earliest known method of showing the position of, and completeness of a train was by the Stockton and Darlington Railway in the 1830s. These early references are to the use of a burning brazier on the rear of the locomotive. It is easy to imagine that the danger represented by this was as significant as the risks it was trying to counter.

The Liverpool and Manchester Railway were the first to codify the requirement for a Tail Lamp in their 1840 Rules and Regulations that a Red Tail Lamp must be carried on each train. The purpose of this was for signallers working under the Absolute Block system to ensure that trains were complete when passing their signal box.

Such lamps were required to be carried by the rear coach of passenger trains and, for freight trains, the brake van (caboose) until their abolition (subsequently, the rear freight wagon must carry such a lamp). Locomotives and Multiple Units must also display a red light at the rear, however this is usually achieved by a lamp or light built into the train.

End of train devices

Design and use 
A "dumb" ETD can be as simple as a red flag attached to the coupler on the last car of the train, whereas "smart" devices monitor functions such as brake line pressure and accidental separation of the train using a motion sensor, functions that were previously monitored by a crew in the caboose. The ETD transmits data via a telemetry link to the Head-of-Train Device (HTD) in the locomotive, known colloquially among railroaders as a "Wilma," after cartoon character Wilma Flintstone. In Canada, this device is known as a sense and braking unit (SBU).

A typical HTD contains several lights indicating telemetry status and rear end movement, along with a digital readout of the brake line pressure from the ETD. It also contains a toggle switch used to initiate an emergency brake application from the rear end. In modern locomotives, the HTD is built into the locomotive's computer system, and the information is displayed on the engineer's computer screen.

Railroads have strict government-approved air brake testing procedures for various circumstances when assembling trains or switching out cars en route. After a cut is made between cars in a train and the train is rejoined, in addition to other tests, the crew must verify that the brakes apply and release on the rear car (to ensure that all of the brake hoses are connected and the angle cocks, or valves, are opened). In most cases, the engineer is able to use information from the ETD to verify that the air pressure reduces and increases at the rear of the train accordingly, indicating proper brake pipe continuity.  This device is said to constitute a fail-safe condition.

The DPS ETD reduced labor costs, as well as the costs of the purchase and upkeep of cabooses.  The Brotherhood of Conductors, and Brotherhood of Railroad Brakemen were also greatly affected by ETD, as this electronic unit replaced two crewmen per train. The widespread use of ETDs has made the caboose nearly obsolete. Some roads still use cabooses where the train must be backed up, on short local runs,  as rolling offices, or railroad police stations and as transportation for right-of-way maintenance crews. In some cases (see photo) instead of hitching a caboose, an employee stands on the last car when the train is backing up.

Evolution
The first ETD use is attributed to Florida East Coast Railway in 1969, soon after which other Class I railroads began using ETDs as well. By the  mid-1980s they were common equipment.  Early models were little more than a brake line connection / termination, a battery and flashing tail light.  As their use became more widespread through the 1980s, ETDs were equipped with radio telemetry transmitters to send brake pressure data to a receiver in the locomotive.  To reduce the cost of battery replacements, ambient light sensors were added so the flashing light on the ETD would illuminate only during dusk and after dark.  Later models have a small turbine-powered electrical generator using air pressure from the brake line to power the ETD's radio and sensors.

The one-way communication of brake data from the ETD to the locomotive evolved into two-way communication that enables the engineer to apply the brakes from both ends of the train simultaneously in an emergency. This is useful in the event that a blockage (or an unopened valve) in the train's brake line is preventing dumping the air pressure and causing all of the brakes in the train going into an emergency application. Such a situation could be dangerous, as stopping distance increases with fewer functioning brakes. Dumping the brake line pressure from both the front and rear of the train simultaneously ensures that the entire train applies all of its brakes in emergency. Other electronics within the ETD were also enhanced, and many now include GPS receivers as well as the two-way radio communications.

See also 
 Train lights

References

External links

Safety equipment
Rail technologies